Lamaru is a subdistrict in the East Balikpapan, Balikpapan.

Tourisms
 Japanese Soldier Tomb Monument (Monumen Makam Tentara Jepang)
 Lamaru Beach (Pantai Lamaru)
 Lamaru Mirror Lake (Danau Cermin)

References

External links
 Lamaru subdistrict official website (in Indonesia)

Balikpapan